Emanuel Loeschbor (born 16 October 1986)  is an Argentinian-Mexican professional footballer who plays as a center back for Atlético Morelia. He holds Mexican citizenship.

Club history 
On December 2015 Morelia officially announced that Loeschbor will be joining the team on loan from Cruz Azul.

Honours

Club
Cruz Azul
CONCACAF Champions League: 2013–14

References

External links
 

1986 births
Living people
Argentine footballers
Argentine Primera División players
Footballers from Córdoba, Argentina
Argentine expatriate sportspeople in Mexico
Naturalized citizens of Mexico
Mexican footballers
Liga MX players
Racing Club de Avellaneda footballers
Quilmes Atlético Club footballers
Juventud Antoniana footballers
San Martín de Tucumán footballers
Atlético Morelia players
Toros Neza footballers
Cruz Azul footballers
Expatriate footballers in Mexico
Association football defenders